Igor Radović (born 26 January 1978) is a Montenegrin retired footballer.

Club career
He started his career in his hometown club FK Sutjeska, but was in Serbian clubs that, since 2000, in the top league, he spend much of his career. FK Milicionar, OFK Beograd, FK Hajduk Kula and FK Vojvodina are the clubs he had played for, before returning, in 2007, to Montenegro to play in one season with FK Mladost Podgorica.

References

External links
 Profile and stats at Srbijafudbal
 Profile and stats until 2003 at Dekisa.Tripod

1978 births
Living people
Footballers from Nikšić
Association football fullbacks
Serbia and Montenegro footballers
Montenegrin footballers
FK Igalo 1929 players
FK Sutjeska Nikšić players
FK Milicionar players
OFK Beograd players
FK Hajduk Beograd players
FK Hajduk Kula players
FK Pobeda players
FK Vojvodina players
OFK Titograd players
FK Palić players
RFK Novi Sad 1921 players
FK Proleter Novi Sad players
OFK Bačka players
FK Radnički Sombor players
FK TSC Bačka Topola players
First League of Serbia and Montenegro players
Second League of Serbia and Montenegro players
Serbian SuperLiga players
Montenegrin First League players
Montenegrin expatriate footballers
Expatriate footballers in North Macedonia
Montenegrin expatriate sportspeople in North Macedonia
Expatriate footballers in Serbia
Montenegrin expatriate sportspeople in Serbia